

Gruppenführer was an early paramilitary rank of the Nazi Party (NSDAP), first created in 1925 as a senior rank of the SA. Since then, the term Gruppenführer is also used for leaders of groups/teams of the police, fire departments, military and several other organizations.

History

In 1930, Gruppenführer became an SS rank and was originally bestowed upon those officers who commanded SS-Gruppen and also upon senior officers of the SS command staff. In 1932, the SS was reorganized and the SS-Gruppen were reformed into SS-Abschnitte.  A Gruppenführer commanded an SS-Abschnitt while a new rank, that of Obergruppenführer, oversaw the SS-Oberabschnitte which were the largest SS units in Germany.

Initially in the SA, NSKK, and SS, the rank of Gruppenführer was considered equivalent to a full general, but became regarded as equivalent to Generalleutnant after 1934. During the Second World War, when the Waffen-SS began using the rank, an SS-Gruppenführer was considered equal to a Generalleutnant in the Wehrmacht and was referred to as SS-Gruppenführer und Generalleutnant der Waffen-SS. Waffen-SS Gruppenführer also displayed the shoulder boards of a Wehrmacht Generalleutnant.

The insignia for SS-Gruppenführer consisted of three oak leaves centred on both collars of an SS uniform. From 1930 to 1942, the SS insignia was the same as the SA badge of rank; however the SS modified the Gruppenführer insignia slightly to include a collar pip (stern, a star), upon the creation of the rank SS-Oberst-Gruppenführer in April 1942.

In the SA, a Gruppenführer was typically in charge of a number of regiments (known as Standarten) which were formed into SA-Gruppen. The rank of Gruppenführer was also used in several other Nazi paramilitary groups, among them the National Socialist Motor Corps (NSKK) and the National Socialist Flyers Corps (NSFK). In October 1944, the rank of Gruppenführer was adopted by the Volkssturm as a low level non-commissioned officer position in charge of squad sized formations (Gruppe) of Volkssturm soldiers. The term is also a generic term for the function of a leader of a squad of infantry (9 or 10 men – Gruppe) in the German Army (Heer), Waffen-SS, or Luftwaffe ground troops.

Insignia

See also 

List of SS-Gruppenführer
Comparative ranks of Nazi Germany
Uniforms and insignia of the Sturmabteilung
Uniforms and insignia of the Schutzstaffel
Corps colours (Waffen-SS)
Table of ranks and insignia of the Waffen-SS

References
Notes

Bibliography

 
 
 
 

 
SS ranks
Nazi paramilitary ranks
German words and phrases
Two-star officers of Nazi Germany
Lists of generals